Balistes punctatus, the bluespotted triggerfish, is a species of triggerfish from the Eastern Atlantic. It occasionally makes its way into the aquarium trade.

Information
The bluespotted triggerfish is known to not do well with other species within the same family when kept in an aquarium. If other specimens are in the tank with it, the aquarium should be of large size to avoid aggressive and malicious behavior. This species is not only naturally aggressive in its behavior, but it is also curious and known to explore. Another common name for the bluespotted triggerfish is the Golden Heart Triggerfish.

Diet
The bluespotted triggerfish known to be a carnivore.  It is recorded to eat a variety of food that include:
crustaceans
bivalves
echinoderms
fishes
sponges
tunicates
mollusks hydrozoans
benthic organisms
algae

Location
The bluespotted triggerfish can be found in a marine environment within a tropical climate. They can be located in the following areas:
Eastern Atlantic
Morocco 
Angola
Madeira
Canary Islands
Cape Verde

References

Notes
 

Balistidae
Fish described in 1789
Taxa named by Johann Friedrich Gmelin